Millboro School, also known as Millboro Elementary School, Millboro High School, and Bath County High School, is a historic school complex located at Millboro, Bath County, Virginia. It was built in three phases. The original two-story, brick school building dates from 1916–1918. The Colonial Revival style building has a standing-seam metal hipped roof, with two tall central chimneys and a central hipped dormer. In 1933, a separate two-story, hipped roof, brick classroom structure with a gymnasium/auditorium wing was constructed to the east of the original building.  The two structures were connected in 1962, with the addition of a one-story building.  Also on the property is a contributing Home Economics Cottage (1933) and Agricultural Instruction Building (1936).  The school closed in 1989.

The complex was listed on the National Register of Historic Places in 2004.

References

School buildings on the National Register of Historic Places in Virginia
Colonial Revival architecture in Virginia
School buildings completed in 1918
Schools in Bath County, Virginia
National Register of Historic Places in Bath County, Virginia
1918 establishments in Virginia